Diwata is another term for nature and ancestor spirits (anito) in the Visayan, Palawan, and Mindanao regions in the indigenous Filipino animistic beliefs. It can also refer to:

 Diwata (song), a song by Filipino rapper Abra featuring Chito Miranda
 Philippine satellites
 Diwata-1, a microsatellite launched to the International Space Station (ISS) on March 23, 2016
 Diwata-2, a microsatellite launched on October 29, 2018

Visayan mythology